The weightlifting competitions at the 2001 Mediterranean Games in Tunis between 3 September and 8 September.

Athletes competed in 30 events across 15 weight categories (8 for men and 7 for women).

Medal summary

Men's events

Women's events

Medal table
Key:

References

External links
2001 Mediterranean Games report at the International Committee of Mediterranean Games (CIJM) website

2001
2001 in weightlifting